Arnošt Poisl (born 2 December 1939) is a Czech rower. He competed in the men's coxed four event at the 1964 Summer Olympics.

References

1939 births
Living people
Czech male rowers
Olympic rowers of Czechoslovakia
Rowers at the 1964 Summer Olympics
Place of birth missing (living people)